A list of windmills in the Dutch province of Groningen.

Notes
Mills still standing marked in bold. Known building dates are bold, otherwise the date is the earliest known date the mill was standing.

Unless otherwise indicated, the source for all entries is the linked Molendatabase or De Hollandsche Molen entry.

References

 
Groningen